"X-ing Off the Days" is a song by English alternative rock band Queenadreena, released as their second single from their album Taxidermy (2000).

Release
"X-ing Off the Days" was released as a CD single by Blanco y Negro records in 1999.

Track listing

Personnel
Musicians
KatieJane Garsidevocals
Crispin Grayguitar
Orson Wajihbass
Billy Freedomdrums

Technical
Ken Thomasproduction, engineering
Headrecording

References

2000 singles
2000 songs
Queenadreena songs
Blanco y Negro Records singles